John S. Driscoll (August 31, 1934 – February 5, 2019) was an American journalist who served as editor of The Boston Globe from 1986 to 1993.

Biography
Driscoll was born in Melrose, Massachusetts, and first worked for The Boston Globe as a high school correspondent. He earned a degree from Northeastern University in 1957 and worked for the Union Leader of Manchester, New Hampshire; the Haverhill Journal of Haverhill, Massachusetts; and United Press International.  He re-joined the Globe in 1958.

Rising through the ranks of the Globe, Driscoll eventually succeeding Michael C. Janeway as editor in March 1986. He left the Globe in 1994, retiring to Rye, New Hampshire.

Driscoll and his wife, Dolores, had four daughters. He authored a memoir about his parents and siblings, Picnic for Twelve: A Memoir of the Driscoll Family. Driscoll died in Boston in February 2019.

References

Further reading
 

1934 births
2019 deaths
People from Melrose, Massachusetts
Northeastern University alumni
Journalists from Massachusetts
The Boston Globe people
American newspaper editors